Lord Josceline William Percy (17 July 1811 – 25 July 1881) was a British Conservative politician.

Background and education
Percy was the second son of George Percy, 5th Duke of Northumberland by his wife Louisa, daughter of the Hon. James Stuart-Wortley. Algernon Percy, 6th Duke of Northumberland was his elder brother and Lord Henry Percy his younger brother. After his father succeeded in the dukedom of Northumberland in 1865 he was styled Lord Josceline Percy.

He was educated at Eton and St John's College, Cambridge, graduating MA in 1833.

Political career
Percy was elected Member of Parliament for Launceston in the 1852 general election, a seat he held until 1859.

Family
Percy married Margaret, daughter of Sir David Davidson and widow of Sir Robert Grant, in 1848. He died in July 1881, aged 70. His wife died in June 1885.

References

External links 
 

1811 births
1881 deaths
People educated at Eton College
Alumni of St John's College, Cambridge
Members of the Parliament of the United Kingdom for Launceston
Younger sons of dukes
UK MPs 1852–1857
UK MPs 1857–1859
Conservative Party (UK) MPs for English constituencies